Agoro Sare High School (ASHS) is a public high school for boys located in Oyugis, Homa Bay County, Kenya. It was established in 1958 and is categorized as an Extra-County School meaning up to 40% of students from outside the county can be enrolled into the institution.

Athletics 
The school competes in the Kenya Secondary Schools Sports Association (KSSSA), as a secondary school in Kenya. In 2019, Term 1 games, Agoro Sare High beat arch rivals Maseno High School in Nyanza Regional Basketball contest to become the new 2019 Champions.

Notable alumni 

 Evans Kidero, politician

References 

Homa Bay County
High schools and secondary schools in Kenya
Educational institutions established in 1958
1958 establishments in Kenya
Public schools in Kenya
Boys' schools in Kenya